Paṅjāb Gharānā (Urdu:پنجاب گھرانا) (Hindi: पंजाब घराना) (Punjabi: ਪੰਜਾਬ ਘਰਾਨਾ) (sometimes called Punjabi or Paṅjābī Gharānā), is a style and technique of tabla playing that originated in the Punjab region of the Indian subcontinent, now split between present-day Pakistan and India. The Punjab Gharana is considered one of the six main styles of tabla, the others being Delhi, Ajrada, Banares, Lucknow, and Farrukhabad. The repertoire of the Punjab Gharana is heavily influenced by the Pakhawaj.

Lineage

Tabla masters

Alla Rakha (1919–2000)
Teacher: Mian Qadir Bakhsh II
Alla Rakha Khan (born Allah Rakha Qureshi) was one of the most famous and widely recorded tabla players of the twentieth century. For tabla, Ustad Alla Rakha was such an artist, having brought his instrument a stature and respect never before enjoyed. He moved from Lahore to Bombay in the late 1940s and took full advantage of the opportunity to be in the public eye when Ravi Shankar retained him as his regular touring accompanist from around 1962 onwards. What he lacked in beauty of tone, Alla Rakha more than made up for it, with the most magically intuitive and natural sense of rhythm – an ability to play outside the beat while always remaining entirely cognizant of it. Rakha popularized the art of tabla, playing across the globe, elevating the status and respect of his instrument. Abbaji (as he was affectionately known by his disciples) also bridged the gap between Carnatic music and Hindustani music by playing with both renowned Carnatic musicians and other Hindustani stalwarts.

Leading American percussionists in rock n' roll, such as the Grateful Dead's Mickey Hart, admired him and studied his technique, benefiting greatly even from single meetings. Hart, a published authority on percussion in world music, said "Alla Rakha is the Einstein, the Picasso; he is the highest form of rhythmic development on this planet." Rakha also collaborated with Jazz master Buddy Rich, recording an album together in 1968.His consistently brilliant performances made the tabla a familiar percussion instrument the world over. 
In 1985, he founded the Ustad Alla Rakha Institute of Music to train young tabla players in the tradition of the Punjab gharana.
Ustad Alla Rakha died on 3 February 2000, truly one of the most pivotal and influential artists to have emerged from India in our time.

Mian Shaukat Hussain (1930–1996)
Teachers: Pandit Hiralal & Mian Qadir Bukhsh
Characterized by the most distinct sur/tone recorded so far, Miyan Shaukat Hussain Khan is ranked amongst the finest musicians of South Asia. He is the last tabla player of Punjab gharana to be bestowed upon with the title of "Miyan" (meaning the one with knowledge) which is the highest ranking title in north Indian classical music. Thus he is considered as the greatest tabla player of Punjab gharana after his teacher Mian Qadir Bakhsh.

Shaukat Hussain gained fame in the realm of solo through his self composed qaidas, which are now played with proud by his students. He was a master of the subject of "tete-dhete" and his qaidas on the subject are the best of their kind across all the gharanas of tabla. His challan (style) of three-finger tere-kete also gained him critical fame among the musically educated audience.

Apart from his prowess over the solo repertoire, the maestro's forte was his impeccable accompaniment. Shaukat Hussain Khan was the accompanist of choice for Pakistan's great vocalists and instrumentalists like Amanat ali Fateh Ali Khan, Salamat Ali Nazakat Ali Khan, Roshan Ara Begum and he always offered impeccable support. He developed a unique style of accompanying called "barjasta (spontaneous) angg, which can particularly be heard in his performances with Salamat Ali Khan.

As a soloist, one hears the Delhi roots of his sound mixed with a truly Punjabi sense of rhythmic complexity. One can hear this complexity in the varied internal phrase lengths of pieces and in the taal structures. He was famous for his highly level of melodic variation and modulation of his bayan (the left hand base drum) and kept his bayan in rather lower pitch register, which allowed him to work more extensively with his wrist, thus embellishing his tabla.

Now after the death of Mian Shaukat Hussain Khan, his son, Ustad Raza Shaukat became a Khalifa continuing the tradition of the Punjab gharana in Pakistan.

Altaf Hussain or Ustad Tafu (1945–2021)
Teachers: Mian Qadir Bukhsh & Haji Fida Hussain
The renowned Ustad Tafu is recognised for his matchless "tayyari". His solo performances are characterised by his dazzling prowess over difficult "bols" and charismatic stage presence. Ustad Tafu has been and still continues to be a major film music director in Pakistan and has composed music for over 700 films over a period of 35 years for the Pakistani film industry.

Abdul Sattar or Tari Khan (born 1953)
Teacher: Mian Shaukat Hussain Khan

Hailing from a traditional Rababi family (musicians employed in the Sikh temples of Punjab), Tari Khan learned under Shaukat Hussain Khan in Lahore and became famous as the accompanist of the ghazal singer Ghulam Ali (his "Chupke Chupke" ghazal was a major hit back in the early 1980s). Tari always provided an exquisite accompaniment: clean, crisp "thekas" with astonishingly quick and interesting "laggis" to punctuate the verses. Because of that international exposure, musicians in India got to hear of him at a time when little cultural news escaped from Pakistan, and most were impressed with this show of virtuosity. Since then, Tari has gone on to international fame as a tabla showman. His "International Kherwa" was a popular item (a musical journey round the world that incorporated other musical styles into the basic four-beat pattern).

Zakir Hussain (born 1951)

Teacher/Father: Ustad Alla Rakha
Zakir Hussain is the most famous and influential tabla player of the modern age. Ustad Zakir Hussain is more than a brilliant tabla player, he is a musical phenomenon who has changed the way we think about the tabla and the musicians who play it. It is difficult to think of anyone else in the world who has made the instrument tabla such a lovable one ... The son of Allarakha Khan, he endeared himself to the world as a most sensitive and responsive accompanist, a dazzling soloist, and an adventurous fusion player (most notably with Shakti in the 1970s). Hussain was a child prodigy, and was touring by the age of twelve. He went to the United States in 1970, embarking on an international career which includes more than 160 concert dates a year. He has composed and recorded many albums and soundtracks, and has received widespread recognition as a composer for his many ensembles and collaborations.

Yogesh Samshi (born 1968)
Pandit Yogesh Samsi born in Mumbai to renowned vocalist Pandit Dinkar Kaikini.[3] His father the eminent vocalist Dinkar Kaikini initiated Yogesh at the age of six.[4] At the age of four he started learning the tabla from Pandit H. Taranth Rao. Later, he sought the guidance of Ustad Allarakha Khan, one of the greatest percussionists. He spent 23 years under the tutelage of Allarakha.

Yogesh Samsi has accompanied the top grade instrumentalists and vocalists and dancers of India, including Ustad Vilayat Khan, Pt. Ajoy Chakroborty, Pt Dinkar Kaikini, Pandit Bhimsen Joshi, Pt Shivkumar Sharma, Pt Hariprasad Chaurasia, Ken Zuckerman and Pt Birju Maharaj. He strives to keep up his revered Guru's word of preserving the tradition in the presentation of tabla solo. He also appeared in the first episode of Idea Jalsa with Shivkumar Sharma & Takahiro Arai.

References

Classical music in Pakistan
Hand drums
Indian music
Instrumental gharanas
Music schools in Pakistan
Pakistani classical musicians
Pakistani music
Tabla gharanas